Prince Francis (born 15 July 1957) is a Jamaican cricketer. He played in fifteen first-class and eight List A matches for the Jamaican cricket team from 1982 to 1988.

See also
 List of Jamaican representative cricketers

References

External links
 

1957 births
Living people
Jamaican cricketers
Jamaica cricketers
People from Saint Ann Parish